Heart & Soul is the nineteenth studio album by Joe Cocker, released in the UK on 12 October 2004, and in the US on 1 February 2005.  The album is composed solely of cover songs, including a live version of the U2 song "One" taken from Cocker's 2004 Night of the Proms performance in Antwerp, Belgium.

The album reached No. 61 on Billboard's 200.

Track listing
"What's Going On" – 5:12 (Renaldo Benson, Al Cleveland, Marvin Gaye)
"Chain of Fools" – 3:45 (Don Covay)
"One" – 4:33 (U2)
"I Who Have Nothing" – 4:00 (Carlo Donida Labati, Jerry Leiber, Mike Stoller, Julio Rapetti)
"Maybe I'm Amazed" – 3:23 (Paul McCartney)
"I Keep Forgetting" – 3:33 (Leiber, Stoller)
"I Put a Spell on You" – 4:31 (Screamin' Jay Hawkins)
"Every Kind of People" – 4:19 (Andy Fraser)
"Love Don't Live Here Anymore" – 4:14 (Miles Gregory)
"Don't Let Me Be Lonely" – 3:40 (James Taylor)
"Jealous Guy" – 4:06 (John Lennon)
"Everybody Hurts" – 5:20 (Bill Berry, Peter Buck, Mike Mills, Michael Stipe)

Personnel 
 Joe Cocker – lead vocals
 C. J. Vanston – keyboards; (organ, acoustic and electric pianos, synthesizers) (2, 4-6, 8-12), bass (2, 5, 9, 10, 12), guitar (10, 12), drums (10, 12), percussion (10, 12), santoor (10, 12), saxophone (10, 12), trombone (10, 12)
 Shane Fontayne – guitar (1, 5, 7-9)
 Steve Lukather – guitar solo (1, 5, 12)
 Jeff Baxter – guitar solo (2)
 Michael Landau – guitar (2, 4-7, 11)
 Dean Parks – guitar (2, 4-6, 11), nylon guitar (7)
 Michael Thompson – guitar (3)
 Jeff Beck – guitar solo (4)
 Eric Clapton – guitar solo (7)
 Gene Black – guitar (8)
 Bruce Gaitsch – acoustic guitar (8)
 Leland Sklar – bass (4, 6, 11)
 Ray Neapolitan – bass (7, 8)
 Ray Brinker – drums (2, 4-7, 11)
 Vinnie Colaiuta – drums (8, 9)
 Rafael Padilla – percussion (1-5, 7, 11)
 Bruce Eskovitz – saxophone (2, 4, 6)
 Nick Lane – trombone (2, 4, 6)
 Bill Churchville – trumpet (2, 4, 6)
 Chris Tedesco – trumpet (2, 4, 6)
 Chris Botti – trumpet (9)
 Jerry Goodman – violin solo (3)
 Alexander Adhami – santoor (8)
 Shelly Berg – orchestra conductor
 Danielle Ondarza – orchestra contractor
 Bernie Barlow – backing vocals (1)
 Terry Dexter – backing vocals (2)
 C.C. White – backing vocals (2)

Production 
 Joe Cocker – executive producer
 Roger Davies – executive producer
 Ray Neapolitan – executive producer
 C. J. Vanston – producer, engineer, tracking (1, 3), mixing (2, 6, 9-12)
 Marc DeSisto – engineer
 Greg Ladanyi – engineer, mixing (2, 6, 9-12)
 Kevin Harp – assistant engineer, Pro Tools engineer
 James Hoyson – assistant engineer
 Bruce Monical – assistant engineer
 Chris Wonzer – assistant engineer
 Bob Clearmountain – mixing (1, 3, 4, 5, 7, 8)
 Sixtus Oechsle – sound editing
 Dave Carlock – Pro Tools engineer 
 Robert Hadley – mastering
 Doug Sax – mastering
 Tom Halm – production coordination, music copyist
 Jeri Heiden – art direction
 Ryan Corey – design
 Kevin Westenberg – photography
 Christopher Wray-McCann – photography

Charts

References

2004 albums
Joe Cocker albums
Covers albums
EMI Records albums
Parlophone albums